Antonio Carvalho (born May 30, 1979) is a retired Canadian mixed martial artist. A professional from 2002 until 2013, he fought in the UFC and Shooto.

Mixed martial arts career

Early career
Carvalho made his professional MMA debut in September 2002. Over the next ten years, he fought in his native Canada and in Japan.  He amassed a record of 13 wins and 4 losses before joining the Ultimate Fighting Championship.

Ultimate Fighting Championship
In 2011, Antonio signed a multi-fight contract with the UFC and was expected to make his debut at UFC 134 against newcomer Yuri Alcantara. However an injury during training forced him out of his planned UFC debut.

Carvalho made his promotional debut against Felipe Arantes on January 14, 2012 at UFC 142, losing by unanimous decision.

Carvalho was expected to face George Roop on July 21, 2012 at UFC 149.  However, Roop was forced out of the bout with an injury and replaced by Daniel Pineda. Carvalho defeated Pineda via KO in 71 seconds.

Carvalho next faced Rodrigo Damm on November 17, 2012 at UFC 154. He won the fight via split decision.

Carvalho then faced Darren Elkins on March 16, 2013 at UFC 158. Carvalho lost the fight via TKO (punches) in the first round and was subsequently released from the promotion.

World Series of Fighting
Carvalho will fight his first bout since leaving the UFC on February 12, 2015 at World Series of Fighting 18 in Edmonton, Alberta against Chris Gruetzemacher.

Personal life
Carvalho is of Portuguese descent and speaks Portuguese fluently, having moved to Portugal from Canada at nine years old.

Mixed martial arts record

|-
| Loss
| align=center| 15–6
| Darren Elkins
| TKO (punches)
| UFC 158
| 
| align=center| 1
| align=center| 3:06
| Montreal, Quebec, Canada
| 
|-
| Win
| align=center| 15–5
| Rodrigo Damm
| Decision (split)
| UFC 154
| 
| align=center| 3
| align=center| 5:00
| Montreal, Quebec, Canada
| 
|-
| Win
| align=center| 14–5
| Daniel Pineda
| KO (punches)
| UFC 149
| 
| align=center| 1
| align=center| 1:11
| Calgary, Alberta, Canada
| 
|-
| Loss
| align=center| 13–5
| Felipe Arantes
| Decision (unanimous)
| UFC 142
| 
| align=center| 3
| align=center| 5:00
| Rio de Janeiro, Brazil
| 
|-
| Win
| align=center| 13–4
| Doug Evans
| Decision (unanimous)
| Score Fighting Series
| 
| align=center| 3
| align=center| 5:00
| Mississauga, Ontario, Canada
| 
|-
| Win
| align=center| 12–4
| Juan Barrantes
| KO (punch)
| Warrior-1 MMA: Judgement Day
| 
| align=center| 1
| align=center| 2:00
| Laval, Quebec, Canada
| 
|-
| Win
| align=center| 11–4
| Eddie Fyvie
| Decision (unanimous)
| Warrior-1 MMA: Bad Blood
| 
| align=center| 3
| align=center| 5:00
| Montreal, Quebec, Canada
| 
|-
| Loss
| align=center| 10–4
| Yuji Hoshino
| Decision (unanimous)
| Cage Force
| 
| align=center| 3
| align=center| 5:00
| Tokyo, Japan
|Featherweight debut.
|-
| Loss
| align=center| 10–3
| Hiroyuki Takaya
| TKO (knees and punches) 
| Shooto: Back To Our Roots 6
| 
| align=center| 3
| align=center| 1:58
| Tokyo, Japan
| 
|-
| Win
| align=center| 10–2
| Hatsu Hioki
| Decision (split)  
| Shooto: Back To Our Roots 3
| 
| align=center| 3
| align=center| 5:00
| Tokyo, Japan
| 
|-
| Loss
| align=center| 9–2
| Takeshi Inoue
| TKO (punches)
| Shooto: The Devilock
| 
| align=center| 1
| align=center| 3:06
| Tokyo, Japan
| 
|-
| Win
| align=center| 9–1
| Rumina Sato 
| TKO (punches)
| Shooto: The Victory of the Truth
| 
| align=center| 2
| align=center| 0:49
| Tokyo, Japan
| 
|-
| Loss
| align=center| 8–1
| Jeff Curran
| Decision (majority)
| Ironheart Crown
| 
| align=center| 3
| align=center| 5:00
| Hammond, Indiana, United States
| 
|-
| Win
| align=center| 8–0
| Takeshi Inoue
| Decision (majority) 
| Shooto: Alive Road
| 
| align=center| 3
| align=center| 5:00
| Kanagawa Prefecture, Japan
| 
|-
| Win
| align=center| 7–0
| Tommy Lee  
| Submission (triangle choke) 
| WFF 8: Dominance
| 
| align=center| 1
| align=center| 2:02
| Vancouver, British Columbia, Canada
| 
|-
| Win
| align=center| 6–0
| Christian Allen
| TKO (punches)
| IHC 7: The Crucible
| 
| align=center| 2
| align=center| 3:55
| Hammond, Indiana, United States
| 
|-
| Win
| align=center| 5–0
| John Louro
| Submission (bulldog choke) 
| World Freestyle Fighting 6
| 
| align=center| 1
| align=center| 2:45
| Vancouver, British Columbia, Canada
| 
|-
| Win
| align=center| 4–0
| Eric Davidson 
| TKO (punch)
| Ultimate Generation Combat 7
| 
| align=center| 1
| align=center| 0:45
| Montreal, Quebec, Canada
| 
|-
| Win
| align=center| 3–0
| Phillipe Lagace   	
| TKO (punches)
| TKO Major League MMA
| 
| align=center| 2
| align=center| 3:10
| Montreal, Quebec, Canada
| 
|-
| Win
| align=center| 2–0
| Brian Geraghty
| TKO (punches)
| Freestyle Combat Challenge 10
| 
| align=center| 2
| align=center| 0:35
| Racine, Wisconsin, United States
| 
|-
| Win
| align=center| 1–0
| Luke Boutin
| Submission (triangle choke)
| Maximum Fighting Championship
| 
| align=center| 1
| align=center| 1:29
| Calgary, Alberta, Canada
|

References

External links
 
 

1979 births
Living people
Canadian male mixed martial artists
Featherweight mixed martial artists
Mixed martial artists utilizing Shotokan
Mixed martial artists utilizing shootboxing
Mixed martial artists utilizing judo
Mixed martial artists utilizing Brazilian jiu-jitsu
Sportspeople from Sault Ste. Marie, Ontario
Canadian people of Portuguese descent
Canadian practitioners of Brazilian jiu-jitsu
People awarded a black belt in Brazilian jiu-jitsu
Canadian male judoka
Canadian male karateka
Canadian male kickboxers
Ultimate Fighting Championship male fighters